Rabali Blackpool is a former South African football club.

The club was created when the league franchise was purchased by businessman Peter Rabali from D'Alberton Callies following the 1994 National Soccer League season. Rabali relocated the club to Thohoyandou and renamed the club to Rabali Blackpool.

The club were relegated from the National Soccer League in 1995.

League History

References

Association football clubs established in 1994
Soccer clubs in Limpopo
1994 establishments in South Africa